Alexander Jackson Møller (born 21 January 1990) is a Danish professional football defender who plays for B1908.

References

External links
 National team profile
 Official Danish Superliga statistics
 

1990 births
Living people
Danish men's footballers
Aarhus Gymnastikforening players
Hobro IK players
Danish Superliga players
Association football defenders